Two-time defending champion Rafael Nadal defeated Dominic Thiem in a rematch of the previous year's final, 6–3, 5–7, 6–1, 6–1 to win the men's singles tennis title at the 2019 French Open. It was his record-extending twelfth French Open title and 18th major title overall. With the win, Nadal broke the all-time record for the most singles titles won by a player at the same major (previously shared with Margaret Court, who won the Australian Open eleven times).	

Novak Djokovic and Roger Federer were both attempting to achieve the first double career Grand Slam in men's singles in the Open Era, with Djokovic also in contention to achieve a second non-calendar year Grand Slam, but both lost in the semifinals (Djokovic to Thiem and Federer to Nadal). This was Federer's first time playing the French Open in four years. Federer's third round match marked his 400th major match, an all-time record. Federer also became the oldest man to reach the fourth round at Roland Garros since Nicola Pietrangeli in 1972, as well as the oldest semifinalist since the 40 year-old Pancho Gonzales in 1968.

The first round match between Ivo Karlović (40 years and three months) and Feliciano López (37 years and 8 months) was the oldest French Open men's singles match in terms of combined ages in the Open Era. Karlović became the oldest male singles player to compete in the tournament since István Gulyás in 1973. Stefanos Tsitsipas became the first Greek player to reach the round of 16 at Roland Garros since Lazaros Stalios in 1936.

For only the third time in the Open Era and the first time since the 1970 Australian Open, all of the top 10 seeds reached the round of 16 at a men's singles major. It was also the first time since the 2013 Australian Open that the top four seeds (Djokovic, Nadal, Federer, and Thiem) all reached the semifinals of a major, and the first time since the 2012 French Open that the Big Three all reached the semifinals of a major.

This marked the final major appearance of 2009 US Open champion Juan Martín del Potro, who lost to Karen Khachanov in the fourth round. Del Potro would retire from tennis in 2022 due to recurring injuries.

Seeds
All seedings per ATP rankings.

Qualifying

Draw

Key

 Q = Qualifier
 WC = Wild card
 LL = Lucky loser
 PR = Protected Ranking
 w/o = Walkover
 r = Retired
 d = Defaulted
<noinclude>

Finals

Top half

Section 1

Section 2

Section 3

Section 4

Bottom half

Section 5

Section 6

Section 7

Section 8

Championship match ratings
1.785 million on NBC, in the USA

References

External links
Main draw
2019 French Open – Men's draws and results at the International Tennis Federation

Men's Singles
2019